The diploic veins are large, thin-walled valveless veins that channel in the diploë between the inner and outer layers of the cortical bone in the skull. They are lined by a single layer of endothelium supported by elastic tissue. They develop fully by the age of two years. The diploic veins drain this area into the dural venous sinuses. The four major trunks of the diploic veins found on each side of the head are frontal, anterior temporal, posterior temporal, and occipital diploic veins. They tend to be symmetrical, with the same pattern of large veins on each side of the skull.

Types of diploic veins
The frontal, which opens into the supraorbital vein and the superior sagittal sinus.

The anterior temporal, which is confined chiefly to the frontal bone, and opens into the sphenoparietal sinus and into one of the deep temporal veins, through an aperture in the great wing of the sphenoid.

The posterior temporal, which is situated in the parietal bone, and ends in the transverse sinus, through an aperture at the mastoid angle of the parietal bone or through the mastoid foramen.

The occipital, the largest of the four, which is confined to the occipital bone, and opens either externally into the occipital vein, or internally into the transverse sinus or into the confluence of the sinuses (torcular Herophili).

References 

Veins of the head and neck